is a Japanese tarento and actress. She was born in Nagasaki Prefecture, and raised in Mie Prefecture. She has appeared in several films, including Say "I love you" (2014) and Ghost Theater (2015), and has played leading roles in the TV Drama Kinkyori Renai: Season Zero (2014) and Yōkoso, Wagaya e (2015).

Filmography

Films
Love Center (2008), Rika
An Encyclopedia of Unconventional Women (2009), Tamae
Ongakubito (2010), Karen Minami
Go! Boys' School Drama Club (2011), Tamaki
Diamond (2013), Nao
Tokyo Legends I: Horror Of Human Hell (2014)
Goose Bumps The Movie 2 (2014)
Say "I love you" (2014), Aiko Muto
Fantastic Girls (2015), Takemi Akimoto (1980s), Takemi Akimoto
Ghost Theater (2015), Kaori
Mars: Tada, Kimi wo Aishiteru (2016)
Kizudarake no Akuma (2017), Mai Kasai

Tokusatsu
Kamen Rider × Kamen Rider Wizard & Fourze: Movie War Ultimatum (2012), Miyoko Ohki

Television
Scrap Teacher (NTV / 2008)
Mirai Kōshi Meguru (TV Asahi / 2008)
Twin Spica (NHK / 2009)
Gegege no Nyōbo (NHK / 2010)
Hammer Session! (TBS / 2010)
Onmitsu Happyaku Yachō (NHK / 2011)
Aibō Season 11 (TV Asahi / 2012-2013)
irodorihimura (TBS / 2012)
Amachan (NHK / 2013)
Yamada-kun and the Seven Witches (Fuji TV / 2013)
The Complex-Prologue (TBS-MBS / 2013)
Tokyo Toy Box  (TV Tokyo / 2013)
Giga Tokyo Toy Box (TV Tokyo / 2014)
Tokubō Keisatsuchō Tokushu Bōhanka (NTV-YTV / 2014)
Black President (Fuji TV-KTV / 2014)
Kinkyori Renai: Season Zero (NTV / 2014)
Your Story (Fuji TV / 2015)
Dr. Storks (TBS / 2015)
Pretty Proofreader (NTV / 2016)
Poison Daughter, Holy Mother (Wowow / 2019)

Anime
Pokémon XY: Hakai no Mayu to Diancie/Pokémon the Movie: Diancie and the Cocoon of Destruction (2014) - Marilyn Flame
Detective Conan: The Eleventh Striker (movie 16) as Rika Adachi (2012)

Bibliography

Magazines
 Duet, Shueisha 1986-, since 2008
 Myojo, Shueisha 1952-, since 2008

Photobooks
 Rika1 (17 October 2008, Gakken) 
 16→17 Boracay-tō ni Itte Kimashita! (23 December 2009, Gakken Publishing) 
 Tokidoki Dokidoki (24 January 2011, Wani Books) 
 Adajiring (27 June 2013, Wani Books) 
 Rika 2007→2014 (3 October 2014, Gakken Publishing)

Awards
 The 32nd Horipro Talent Scout Caravan (2007): Won

References

External links 
  
 

1992 births
Japanese television personalities
Living people
21st-century Japanese actresses
Actors from Nagasaki Prefecture